The 2015 Copa Fila was a professional tennis tournament played on clay courts. It was the fifth edition of the tournament which was part of the 2015 ATP Challenger Tour. It took place in Buenos Aires, Argentina between 9 and 15 November 2015.

Singles main-draw entrants

Seeds

 1 Rankings are as of November 2, 2015.

Other entrants
The following players received wildcards into the singles main draw:
  Guido Andreozzi
  Juan Ignacio Londero
  Facundo Mena
  Tomás Lipovšek Puches

The following players received entry from the qualifying draw:
  Andrea Collarini
  Martín Cuevas 
  Cristian Garín 
  Thiago Monteiro

The following player received entry as a lucky loser:
  Hugo Dellien

Champions

Singles

 Kyle Edmund def.  Carlos Berlocq 6–0, 6–4

Doubles

 Julio Peralta /  Horacio Zeballos def.  Guido Andreozzi /  Lukas Arnold Ker 6–2, 7–5

External links
Official Website

Copa Fila